Mount Wyatt is a prominent flat-topped mountain, 2,930 m, standing 3 nautical miles (6 km) west of Mount Verlautz in the Rawson Mountains of the Queen Maud Mountains. Discovered in December 1934 by the Byrd Antarctic Expedition geological party under Quin Blackburn and named by Rear Admiral Byrd for Jane Wyatt, a friend of Richard S. Russell, Jr., a member of that party.

Mountains of the Ross Dependency
Amundsen Coast